Major-General Sir Patrick Hehir  (17 May 1859 – 1 May 1937) was a British military surgeon. He served in the Indian Medical Service (IMS) and as the Principal Medical Officer to the army of the Nizam of Hyderabad. During the 148 day Siege of Kut he suffered alongside the troops and wrote extensively on the topic of prolonged starvation.

Life
He was born on 17 May 1859, the son of Robert Martin Hehir of Ennis in County Clare, Ireland.

He studied at Calcutta University, qualified as a doctor in Brussels's, became a Licentiate of the Royal College of Surgeons and the Royal College of Physicians at the University of Edinburgh, obtained a Diploma in Public Health from the University of Cambridge and then received a Diploma in Tropical Medicine from the University of Liverpool.

In 1893 he was elected a Fellow of the Royal Society of Edinburgh. His proposers were Patrick Doyle, Sir Joseph Fayrer, Sir Byrom Bramwell and Thomas Annandale.

During his years in India he appears to have become an opium addict. Back in Britain, when this was made illegal in 1894, he wrote he rued not being addicted to legal activities.

He saw active service in many military campaigns and was highly decorated. In the First World War he served in Mesopotamia as the Principal Medical Officer. He was present at the Battle of Ctesiphon and the ill-fated Siege of Kut under General Charles Townshend. He was captured when the garrison surrendered on 29 April 1916 but was released 25 September 1916.  He went on to see service in Waziristan in 1917 and lastly Afghanistan (1919).

He retired 9 December 1919.

He died on 1 May 1937.

Honours
See
Companion of the Order of the Bath (CB)
Companion of the Order of St Michael and St George (CMG)
Knight Commander of Order of the Indian Empire (KCIE)
Knight of Grace of the Order of St John of Jerusalem
Campaign Medal, Burma 1886–1887
Campaign Medal, North-West Frontier 1897–1898
Campaign Medal, North-West Frontier 1908, Afghanistan NWF 1919

Publications

Outlines of Medical Jurisprudence for India (1892)
The Medical Profession in India (1923)
Malaria in India (1927)

Family

In 1908 he married Dora Lloyd and together they one daughter.

References

1859 births
1937 deaths
British Indian Army officers
Companions of the Order of the Bath
Companions of the Order of St Michael and St George
Knights Commander of the Order of the Indian Empire
Knights of Grace of the Order of St John
Indian Army generals of World War I
World War I prisoners of war held by the Ottoman Empire
British World War I prisoners of war
19th-century Anglo-Irish people
20th-century Anglo-Irish people
People from County Clare
Alumni of the University of Liverpool
British non-fiction writers
Indian Medical Service officers
19th-century Irish medical doctors
20th-century Irish medical doctors